Beta-alanine aminotransferase may refer to:
 Alanine transaminase, an enzyme
 4-aminobutyrate transaminase, an enzyme